Legionella bozemanae is a Gram-negative bacterium in the family Legionellaceae. Its type strain is WIGA (=ATCC 33217). It is associated with human pneumonia.

References

Further reading

External links

LPSN

Legionellales
Bacteria described in 1980